Marcos is a Spanish and Portuguese masculine given name of Latin origin derived from the name Marcus. Markos is the Greek equivalent, while Marco is the Italian equivalent.

Marcos or Markos may refer to:

Sports
 Marcos Ambrose, Australian racing driver
 Marcos Armas, Venezuela-born American baseball player
 Marcos Assunção, Brazilian football player
 Marcos Baghdatis, Cypriot tennis player and 2006 Australian Open finalist
 Marcos Carvajal, Venezuela-born American baseball player
 Marcos Daniel, Brazilian tennis player
 Marcos Evangelista de Moraes, Brazilian football player better known as Cafu
 Marcos Giron, American tennis player
 Marcos Llorente, Spanish football player
 Marcos Martinez Ucha, Spanish racing car driver
 Marcos Maidana, Argentine professional boxer 
 Marcos Milinkovic, Argentine volleyball player
 Marcos Ondruska, South African tennis player
 Marcos Painter, Irish football player
 Marcos Paquetá, Brazilian football player
 Marcos Pizzelli, Brazilian-Armenian footballer
 Marcos Roberto Silveira Reis, a Brazilian goalkeeper from Palmeiras.
 Marcos Senna, Spanish-Brazilian football player
 Marcos-Antonio Serrano, Spanish cyclist

Radio
 Marcos A. Rodriguez, Cuban-American businessman

Politics
 Markos Drakos (EOKA fighter), Cypriot guerrilla fighter
 Marcos Kyprianou, Cypriot lawyer and politician
 Marcos Morínigo, Paraguayan politician and former president
 Markos Natsinas, Greek politician
 Marcos Pérez Jiménez, Venezuelan politician
 Markos Vafiadis, leading cadre of the Communist Party of Greece

Military
 Markos Botsaris, Greek military leader
 Markos Drakos (general), Greek army general

Television and film
 Marcos Ferraez, American actor
 Marcos Siega, American film and music director
 Marcos A. Rodriguez, American Media and Film Executive

Music
 Marcos Curiel, American guitarist and a member of P.O.D.
 Marcos Escoriza, lead vocalist of the punk rock band No Children
 Marcos Hernandez (singer), American pop singer
 Marcos Mundstock, Argentine classic musician
 Marcos Nadir, Famous songwriter, singer and a rapper
 Marcos Portugal, Portuguese classical composer
 Marcos Suzano, Brazilian percussionist
 Marcos Valle, Brazilian singer, songwriter and record producer
 Markos Vamvakaris, Greek songwriter and musician
 Marcos Witt, American pastor and musician
 Marcos Tang, Hong Kong teen violinist

Christianity
 St. Mark (Μαρκος) the Evangelist, writer of the Gospel of Mark and later first Bishop of Alexandria
 Mark of Lisbon (Marcos da Silva), Portuguese Franciscan friar and historian
 Marcos de Niza, Spanish Franciscan friar
 Marcos de Torres y Rueda, Spanish bishop of Yucatán and viceroy of New Spain
 Markus Barth (1915–1994), Swiss Theologian - son of Karl

Literature
 Marcos Denevi, Argentine writer and journalist
 Marcos Jiménez de la Espada, Spanish zoologist, explorer and writer
 Marcos Rey, Brazilian writer and playwright
 Markos Sklivaniotis, Greek writer and a poet
 Marcos Valério, Brazilian publicist

Business
 Marcos Prado Troyjo, Brazilian businessman

Other
 Markos Mamalakis, Greek economist
 Marcos Moshinsky, Mexican physicist
 Marcus Musurus, Greek scholar and philosopher
 Marcos Pontes, Brazilian astronaut
 Marcos Restrepo, Ecuatorian painter

Other uses
 Marcos Alonso (disambiguation)
 Marcos Antunes Trigueiro (born 1978), former Brazilian driver

See also
 Marco (given name)
 Marcus (name)

Greek masculine given names
Spanish masculine given names
Portuguese masculine given names